The 2005 Ukrainian Football Amateur League season.

Teams

Returning
 ZAlK Zaporizhia

Debut
List of teams that are debuting this season in the league.

Metalist-UHMK Kyiv, Illichivets Uman, Kolos Stepove, Yalos Yalta, Feniks-Illichovets Kalinine

Withdrawn
List of clubs that took part in last year competition, but chose not to participate in 2005 season:

 Rozdillia Novyi Rozdil
 Iskra Teofipol
 Ukrrichflot Kherson

 Karpaty Yaremche
 FC Korosten
 Slovkhlib Slovyansk

 Torpedo Kostopil
 Interahrosystema Mena

Location map

First stage

Group 1

Group 2

Group 3

Second stage
The games in the group took place on September 11 through 15th in Rivne and Cherkasy.

References

External links
 2005 Ukrainian Football Amateur League. footballfacts.ru
 2005 Ukrainian Football Amateur League. ukranianfootball.narod.ru

Ukrainian Football Amateur League seasons
Amateur
Amateur